Rarian is a document cataloging system (formerly known as Spoon). It manages documentation metadata, as specified by the Open Source Metadata Framework (OMF). Rarian is used by the GNOME desktop help browser, Yelp. It has replaced ScrollKeeper, as originally designed. It provides an API.

References

External links
 Rarian
 Open Source Metadata Framework

Freedesktop.org libraries
GNOME
KDE
Metadata